Kathleen Kingsbury is an American Pulitzer Prize winning  journalist and editor. She is The New York Times's Opinion Editor.

Biography 
Kathleen Kingsbury grew up in Portland, Oregon, and did her undergraduate work at the Walsh School of Foreign Service at Georgetown University. She was awarded a graduate degree from the Columbia Journalism School, where she had been the recipient of a Pulitzer Traveling Fellowship.

Kingsbury worked for Time magazine as New York-based staff writer and as a Hong Kong-based correspondent. In 2013 Kingsbury joined the editorial board of The Boston Globe. She also served as managing editor and frequent contributor to the Globe's Sunday supplement section, Ideas. Kingsbury joined The New York Times in August 2017 as a deputy editorial page editor. On June 7, 2020, she was named "as acting Editorial Page Editor through the November election" at The New York Times, replacing James Bennet. In January 2021, she was named Opinion Editor by Publisher A.G. Sulzberger. She has also contributed to Time, Reuters, The Daily Beast, BusinessWeek, and Fortune.

In 2015, Kingsbury won a Pulitzer Prize for Editorial Writing for a series of articles exposing the unfair working conditions facing restaurant workers, including the negative financial effects of the American tipping system, the prevalence of wage theft, and the real human cost of cheap menu items.

In February 2021, Kingsbury refused to run a column by Bret Stephens in which he criticized the Times's dismissal of Donald G. McNeil Jr. Stephens' comments were later published by the New York Post.

References 

Living people
American women journalists
American women editors
Year of birth missing (living people)
Georgetown University alumni
Columbia University Graduate School of Journalism alumni
The New York Times editorial board
21st-century American women